Rajnish Mishra is an Indian film and music director known for his contributions to Bhojpuri films. Damru, Mehandi Laga Ke Rakhna and Mai Sehra Bandh Ke Aaunga are some notable films directed by Rajnish Mishra. He is widely considered as one of the most successful film and music directors in the Bhojpuri Industry. He made his debut with the blockbuster film, Mehandi Laga Ke Rakhna.

Filmography

See also
Bhojpuri cinema
List of Bhojpuri Films

References

External links
 

Indian male composers
Bhojpuri-language film directors
Living people
1979 births